YFA may refer to:

 Yemen Football Association, the governing body of football in Yemen
 Young Film Academy, an English educational institution
 Fort Albany Airport (IATA code)
 Youth Fire Association - see Junior firefighter